No Rest For Ghosts is an album by Minus Story, released in 2005.

Track listing
"I Was Hit" – 5:53
"Knocking on Your Head" – 3:09
"Ringing in the Dark" – 5:04
"Hold On" – 4:36
"Little Wet Head" – 4:22
"Waking Up" – 5:58
"Will I Be Fighting?" – 5:02
"There Is a Light" – 4:09
"To the Ones You Haunted" – 4:27
"In Our Hands" – 4:27

2005 albums